The Peace of Asti was signed on 21 June 1615, between representatives of King Philip III of Spain and Charles Emmanuel I, Duke of Savoy of regarding the succession of the Marquis of Duchy of Montferrat. The accord was developed after Spain threatened to attack Turin, the capital of Savoy. The treaty ended the War of the Montferrat Succession.

See also
List of treaties

References

External links
Richelieu – Chapter IV
Monferrato War of Succession, 1613–1615

1615 in Europe
17th century in Spain
1615 treaties
Treaties of the Duchy of Savoy
Asti